"If I Know You" is a single by The Presets and the fifth taken from their second studio album Apocalypso. It was originally the proposed third single but was replaced by "Talk Like That".

Content 

"If I Know You" is a break-up song with a Morrissey-like sexual ambiguity, with a vocal hook reminiscent of the 1980 Split Enz hit "I Hope I Never".

Discussing the lyrics, singer Julian Hamilton told Rolling Stone Australia: "It's a break up song but I didn't want it to be a guy pissed off at a girl because that always sounds so wimpy. I thought it'd be cool to write it from a girl's perspective. The lyrics came out a bit weird and we thought maybe we could flog this off to a girl singer, but then I thought no, this song needs to be sung with balls!"

Music video 

The video clip was directed by Eva Husson. The video was awarded Best Dance Video at the 2009 UK Music Video Awards.

Track listings

Charts

Release history

References

External links
 

The Presets songs
2009 singles
2008 songs
Modular Recordings singles